During the 2002–03 season, Sunderland competed in the FA Premier League.

Season Summary
Sunderland spent the entire first half of the 2002–03 Premier League season in and out of the relegation zone. The poor form that the club had ended 2001–02 with continued into this season, resulting in Peter Reid being sacked after seven years as manager following a 3–1 loss to Arsenal in October just before the international break. Three days later, despite speculation linking recently-departed Ireland manager Mick McCarthy to the job, the board made the shock decision to hire Howard Wilkinson, who had been out of club management for six years.

Despite a loss to West Ham in Wilkinson's first match in charge, Sunderland ground out a four-match unbeaten run in the games that followed, as well as gaining a surprise victory over Liverpool and a point against fellow strugglers West Brom just before Christmas. However, a truly appalling second half of the season saw Sunderland earn just one point after Christmas. Wilkinson was sacked in March and McCarthy brought in to replace him, but the change proved too little too late, with Sunderland ending the season with a staggering run of 15 consecutive defeats, and setting new records for the fewest goals scored by a top-flight club, and the lowest points total for a Premier League club since the competition began (albeit not the lowest since the introduction of three points for a win; Sunderland would, however, break that record three seasons later).

Transfers

In

Summer

January

Out

Summer

January

Players

First-team squad
Squad at end of season

Left club during season

Reserve squad

Results

Football League Cup

FA Cup

FA Premier League

League table

Results per matchday

Statistics

Appearances and goals

|-
! colspan=14 style=background:#dcdcdc; text-align:center| Goalkeepers

|-
! colspan=14 style=background:#dcdcdc; text-align:center| Defenders

|-
! colspan=14 style=background:#dcdcdc; text-align:center| Midfielders

|-
! colspan=14 style=background:#dcdcdc; text-align:center| Forwards

|-
! colspan=14 style=background:#dcdcdc; text-align:center| Players transferred out during the season

|}

Goal scorers

References

Notes

Sunderland A.F.C. seasons
Sun